Metaphoenia is a genus of moths of the family Erebidae. The genus was erected by George Hampson in 1926.

Species
Metaphoenia amelaena Hampson, 1926 Solomon Islands
Metaphoenia carneipennis Prout, 1926
Metaphoenia incongrualis (Walker, [1859]) Sri Lanka, Borneo
Metaphoenia plagifera (Walker, 1864) Borneo
Metaphoenia plagifera Walker, 1864
Metaphoenia rectifascia Holloway, 2005
Metaphoenia rhodias (Turner, 1908) Queensland
Metaphoenia scobinata Holloway, 2005

References

Calpinae
Moth genera